Hari Nagar Assembly constituency is one of the 70 Delhi Legislative Assembly constituencies of the National Capital Territory in northern India.

Overview
Present geographical structure of Hari Nagar constituency came into existence in 2008 as a part of the implementation of the recommendations of the Delimitation Commission of India constituted in 2002.

Hari Nagar is part of West Delhi Lok Sabha constituency along with nine other Assembly segments, namely, Uttam Nagar, Rajouri Garden, Madipur, Tilak Nagar, Janakpuri, Vikaspuri, Dwarka, Matiala and Najafgarh.

Members of Legislative Assembly

Key

Election results

2020

2015

2013

2008

2003

1998

1993

References

Assembly constituencies of Delhi
Delhi Legislative Assembly